Legend of DUO (or Legends of the duo) is a Television Saitama program, which had been broadcast in AT-X and anime heaven.

The airtime of the show was 5 min. per episode, lasting for 12 episodes in total.  The series is about an hour long.

Characters
 Duo (voice: Nakamoto Sunao)
 Zeig (voice: Tomokazu Sugita)
 Stefan (voice: Amano Yu)
 Lizzie (voice: Haruhisa Okumura)

Title
 渇血
 大罪 Deadly
 宿業宿業
 銃口 Muzzle
 回顧 Retrospective
 遙命遙命
 偽愛 Fake Love
 蜜月 Honeymoon
 致命 Fatal
 血宴 Blood Feast
 執念 Tenacity
 親愛 Dear

Releases
Aired from April 21, 2005 to June 27, 2005

Reception
Stig Høgset of THEM Anime Reviews criticized the show as "badly animated," even worse than Crying Freeman, saying that "the art is consistently good"  and that the writing is good, including a homosexual flashback involving Zieg. He called the series "hilarious" and called the acting "souless," saying that he recommends watching it once because the "laughs you'll get out of it is definitely worth it."

See also
UHF anime

References

External links
Official Website
Program website

Anime television